Billie Jean King and Martina Navratilova were the defending champions but lost in the final 5–7, 3–6 against Betty Stöve and Wendy Turnbull.

Seeds 
Champion seeds are indicated in bold text while text in italics indicates the round in which those seeds were eliminated. Three seeded teams and 13 unseeded teams received byes into the second round.

Draw

Finals

Top half

Section 1

Section 2

Bottom half

Section 3

Section 4

Sources 
1979 US Open – Women's draws and results at the International Tennis Federation

Women's Doubles
US Open (tennis) by year – Women's doubles
1979 in women's tennis
1979 in American women's sports